Now That Summer is Gone is a 1938 Warner Bros. Merrie Melodies cartoon directed by Frank Tashlin. The short was released on May 14, 1938.

Plot
The cartoon begins with squirrels stockpiling for the forthcoming cold months as hard times will be ahead, as they sing "Now that Summer is Gone". However, a young, flashy-dressed squirrel decides to get nuts through a dice game without making the effort to hunt them. Disregarding his father's advice not to gamble, the young squirrel pays no attention and still insists on the "easy way" on getting his nuts for winter. Before the first snowfall, the young squirrel is told to get their winter supply of nuts from the First Nutional [sic] Bank, and just before he leaves the front door, his father reminds him, "And remember, no gambling!" But on his way home with the nuts, the young squirrel sees a stranger who offers him a game of chance, and despite his father's warning, the foolish young squirrel quickly jumps at the chance. The foolish young squirrel loses every time at every chance game.

Devastated, the squirrel is entirely out of luck and now out of the entire supply of winter nuts. By the time the snow starts falling, the foolish squirrel heads back home without any nuts or any luck in telling his father the truth. So, as soon as he enters his home, he decides to make up a lie and tells his father that he has been robbed by bandits, jumped and badly attacked by them. However, his lying ends very quickly and he goes too far when he discovers that the stranger who won the nuts from him is none other than his own father, who did it to teach his gambling son a lesson for deliberately disobeying him. In spite of this, the lesson, however, does not work. When the disgruntled father concludes that he will give his son ten lashes, and before the young squirrel has a chance to run out the door, he is caught by the tail by his enraged father. As the disgruntled father gets his lashing weapon (a plank) ready, his son tells him that "he'll flip him for it, double or nothing," but his father doesn't believe him and seeing his son didn't learn his lesson. As the cartoon irises out and the "That's All Folks!" ending appears, the foolish squirrel is seen/heard getting lashes from his enraged father.

Home media
LaserDisc - The Golden Age of Looney Tunes, Volume 5, Side 4
DVD - Looney Tunes Golden Collection: Volume 4, Disc 2

The USA Dubbed Print Keeps 1937-1938 MWRA Over 1947-1948 While EU Dubbed Print Uses 1941-1955 MWRA

References

External links

Merrie Melodies short films
1938 films
1938 animated films
Short films directed by Frank Tashlin
1930s Warner Bros. animated short films
Animated films about squirrels
Films about gambling